Events from the year 1993 in South Korea.

Incumbents
President: Roh Tae-woo (until February 24), Kim Young-sam (starting February 24)
Prime Minister: 
 until February 25: Hyun Soong-jong
 February 25 - December 17: Hwang In-sung
 starting December 17: Lee Hoi-chang

Events

July 26 - Asiana Airlines Flight 733 crashes near Mokpo Airport, killing 68 of the 116 passengers and crew.

Births

 January 12 - D.O., actor and singer
 January 21 - Kim Sei-young, golfer
 January 24 - Yoon Ji-su, fencer
 February 4 - Bae Noo-ri, actress
 February 15 – Ravi, rapper and songwriter
 February 27 - Gong Seung-yeon, actress
 February 28 - Hwang Seong-eun, sport shooter
 March 3 - Seo Ji-yeon, fencer
 March 9 - Suga, rapper, songwriter and producer
 March 30 - Ji Soo, actor
 April 22
 Hwayoung, rapper, dancer, model, and actress
 Hyoyoung, model, actress, and singer
 May 7 - Yoon So-hee, actress
 May 16 - IU, singer-songwriter, actress and producer
 June 16 - Park Bo-gum, actor and singer
 June 20 - Kim Jin-yi, handball player
 July 3 - Roy Kim, singer-songwriter
 July 18 - Lee Tae-min, singer
 August 14 - Gongchan, singer
 August 17 - Yoo Seung-ho, actor
 October 12 - Seo Kang-joon, actor and singer

Deaths

 September 5 - Baek Du-jin, politician (b. 1908)

Popular culture

See also
List of South Korean films of 1993
Years in Japan
Years in North Korea

References

 
South Korea
Years of the 20th century in South Korea
1990s in South Korea
South Korea